Eastern Slope Regional Airport , also known as Fryeburg Airport, is a public airport located  southeast of the central business district of Fryeburg, a town in Oxford County, Maine, United States. It is owned by the Town of Fryeburg. The airport is accessible from ME-5 in Fryeburg and Brownfield, Maine. It is very close to Conway, New Hampshire.

Although most U.S. airports use the same three-letter location identifier for the FAA and IATA, Eastern Slope Regional Airport is assigned IZG by the FAA and FRY by the IATA.

History
The airport was built to replace White Mountain Airport in North Conway, which closed in 1988 and was replaced by Settlers Green outlet shopping center.

Until 2004, the airport served very little purpose except to Dearborn Precision Tubular Products, which used it as a cargo stop. In 2004, Eastern Slopes Aviation began to try to secure funding for development at the airport, including the construction of a terminal and the establishment of commuter service from the airport to Portland, Maine, slated to begin in spring 2006. The airport handled 12,605 passengers in 2004.

Facilities and aircraft 
For the 12-month period ending August 26, 2006, the airport had 33,350 aircraft operations, an average of 91 per day: 99% general aviation (33,000), 1% air taxi and <1% military.

Airlines (passenger and cargo) 
Eastern Slopes Aviation (Boston's Logan, Portland)
Linear Air (Air Charter Boston Hanscom, Bedford)

Historical Service
1952–present: Eastern Slopes Aviation
2006: Saco Airlines

References

External links 

Airports in Oxford County, Maine
Fryeburg, Maine